Leonora Milà Romeu (Vilanova i la Geltrú, 1942) is a Catalan pianist and composer.

Biography

The pianist and composer Leonora Milà was born in Vilanova i la Geltrú (Barcelona) in 1942, into a family with close ties to the world of music. Her father, Josep Milà, was a cellist in the Orquestra Pau Casals and the Orquestra del Gran Teatre del Liceu de Barcelona. A disciple of pedagogue Maria Canals, Leonora Milà was dubbed a "child prodigy" in the wake of two concerts she performed in the Palau de la Música Catalana in 1949. Whilst just six years old, she interpreted a piece that she herself had composed, along with Wolfgang Amadeus Mozart's concerto KV488 for piano and orchestra, accompanied by the Orquestra Ciutat de Barcelona.

She started her international career at the age of 12, when she performed piano works by Enric Granados and Manuel de Falla on a BBC London television programme. She returned a year later, in 1955, to interpret composer Manuel de Falla's Nights in the Gardens of Spain in the Royal Albert Hall, performing alongside a London Philharmonic Orchestra conducted by Rudolph Dunbar.

Winner of the 1966 Maria Canals International Music Competition (Barcelona) and finalist of the Concorso Internazionale Viotti (Vercelli, Italy), Leonora Milà has managed to combine, throughout her professional career, her abilities as both a performer and composer. Lengthy tours across Europe, the United States and Asia led her to become the first Spanish artist to perform in the People's Republic of China (1979), to record an album with the China National Symphony Orchestra (1988) and to become the first female composer to premiere a ballet in St. Petersburg. The ballet in question was Tirant lo Blanc, a chivalric novel written by Joanot Martorell in the 15th century, subsequently scored by Leonora Milà and transformed into a two-hour ballet by Russian dancer and choreographer Yuri Petukhov. For her efforts, Milà was awarded the International Catalan Culture Prize in Valencia (1995). Later on, in 1996, Tirant lo Blanc was premiered in the Gran Teatre del Liceu by the St. Petersburg State Ballet company. Motion picture director Antoni Ribas was in charge of filming the ballet, later aired on Televisión Española and released to the public on DVD.

While Leonora Milà boasts a considerable written catalogue comprising over 100 scores, her four concertos for piano and orchestra shine forth; as do the popular Habaneras piano recordings, the songs for voice and piano based on texts by poets the likes of Johann Wolfgang von Goethe, Salvador Espriu and Joan Maragall and two short ballets entitled The Flight of Painter Lee and Drame à trois, both recorded for the St Petersburg State Symphony Orchestra of the Mussorgsky Theatre.

Leonora Milà has released over thirty albums as both a soloist and accompanied by internationally renowned orchestras. Her repertoire includes compositions by master European composers such as Maurice Ravel, Claude Debussy, Ludwig van Beethoven, Robert Schumann and Felix Mendelssohn. She has received particular acclaim for her rendition of Das Wohltemperierte Klavier by J. S. Bach, deemed referential by the specialised press, as well as piano interpretations of the classic Spanish composers Manuel de Falla, Enric Granados, Isaac Albéniz and Joaquín Turina, earning her unanimous public recognition.

Leonora Milà's works are published and distributed by International Music Company (New York) and DINSC Publicacions Musicals (Barcelona).

Selected discography

Piano concertos (Maurice Ravel. 1973)
Manuel de Falla tribute (1976) 
Carnaval (Robert Schumann. 1978)
Piano Works (C. Debussy, L. Milà. 1981)
Das Wohltemperierte Klavier (J. S. Bach. 1983)
Spanish music for piano and orchestra (Falla, Milà, Turina i Guridi. 1986)
Spanish Music (Falla, Turina, Guridi, Milà. 1986)
Triple Concerto (L. van Beethoven. 1990)
Tirant lo Blanc Ballet (L. Milà. 1992)
Habaneras for piano (L. Milà. 1992)
Piano works (Manuel de Falla i Enric Granados. 1994)
Inventionen und Sinfonien (J. S. Bach. 1996)
Music for two choreographies (L. Milà. 2000)
Milà plays Falla (Manuel de Falla. 2009)
Piano Works (Schumann & Mendelssohn. 2013)

Orchestras and groups

London Philharmonic Orchestra
Liverpool Philharmonic Orchestra
Orchestre de la Suisse Romande
Hong Kong Philharmonic Orchestra
Orchestre National de l'Opéra de Monte-Carlo
Orquesta Sinfónica de Radiotelevisión Española
Orquestra Simfònica de Barcelona i Nacional de Catalunya
Manila Symphony Orchestra
Saint Petersburg State Symphony Orchestra of Mussorgsky Theatre
Central Philharmonic of China (China National Symphony Orchestra)
China National Chamber Orchestra
Paderewski Philharmonic Orchestra       
Staatsorchester Braunschweig
Perth Symphony Orchestra
Dundee Philharmonic Orchestra
North Staffordshire Symphony Orchestra
Gävleborgs Symfoniorkester
Orkiestra Symfoniczna Filharmonii Lódzkiej
Orkiestra Symfoniczna Filharmonii Rybnicka
Orkiestra Symfoniczna Filharmonii Poznańskiej
Camerata Eduard Toldrà
The Arctic Chamber Orchestra of Alaska
Orquesta Sinfónica de Navarra Pablo Sarasate
The Slovak State Philharmonic Kosice
Orchestre Du Domaine Musical
Berliner Streichquintett
Quartet de Barcelona

Conductors
Eduard Toldrà
Jacques Bodmer
Jonas Alber
Rudolph Dunbar
Li Delun
Moshe Atzmon
Pierre Colombo
Bela de Csillery
Renard Czajkowski
Miguel Angel Gómez Martínez
Han Zhongjie
Joan Pich Santasusana
John Pritchard
Alun Francis
En Shao
Gordon Wright
Brian Wright
Radomil Eliska
Urs Voegelin
Salvador Brotons

Bibliography
Albert Mallofré: "Retrat de Leonora Milà" (2002). Published for the Ajuntament de Vilanova i la Geltrú

Links
 Official website of Leonora Milà
 Official website of Catalan Composers Association
 Website of CatClàssica
 Website of El far blau produccions SL. Independent Catalan production company responsible of "Leonora Milà. The Intuitively Talented" (documentary).

1942 births
Composers for piano
Composers from Catalonia
Spanish classical pianists
Spanish women pianists
Living people
Women classical composers
People from Vilanova i la Geltrú
Women classical pianists
20th-century classical pianists
20th-century classical composers
20th-century Spanish musicians
21st-century classical pianists
21st-century classical composers
21st-century Spanish musicians
20th-century women composers
21st-century women composers
20th-century Spanish women
20th-century women pianists
21st-century women pianists